A list of films produced in France in 1978.

See also
1978 in France
1978 in French television

References

Footnotes

Sources

External links
 French films of 1978 at the Internet Movie Database
French films of 1978 at Cinema-francais.fr

1978
Films
French